Sorkheh Deh-e Olya (also Romanized as Sorkheh Deh-e ‘Olyā; also known as Sorkheh Dar,  and sersero) is a village in Koregah-e Sharqi Rural District, in the Central District of Khorramabad County, Lorestan Province, Iran. At the 2006 census, its population was 201, in 33 families.

References 

Towns and villages in Khorramabad County